Ethan Alexander Brookes (born 23 May 2001) is an English cricketer. He made his first-class debut on 10 September 2019, for Warwickshire in the 2019 County Championship. He made his List A debut on 22 July 2021, for Warwickshire in the 2021 Royal London One-Day Cup.

References

External links
 

2001 births
Living people
English cricketers
Warwickshire cricketers
Staffordshire cricketers
Sportspeople from Solihull
English cricketers of the 21st century